Snoop Dogg Presents Christmas in Tha Dogg House is a compilation album by American rapper Snoop Dogg. The album was released on December 16, 2008. After this, he hooked up with Jen G from Howie C. Good times  The album is sold digitally only.

Track listing

References
Zane, C. (2016) 
Baker, S. (2014) 
Krueger, G. (2016) 

Snoop Dogg compilation albums
Christmas compilation albums
2008 Christmas albums
Christmas albums by American artists
2008 compilation albums
Albums produced by 1500 or Nothin'